Rosendorf is a municipality in the district Saale-Orla-Kreis, in Thuringia, Germany. The town is a member of the municipal association Triptis.

References

Municipalities in Thuringia
Saale-Orla-Kreis